Balogun Ajeniya Market is a market located on Lagos Island in Lagos State, Nigeria. The market has no particular address because it sprawls across so many streets on the island. Balogun market is recognized as the best place to buy fabrics, shoes , and all sorts of wares.

Fire incident 
There have been different cases of fire incidents in the popular market, the fire occur on a different dates but the most prominent ones occur in November 2019 and  January 2020, most of the fire incidents always occur during the dry season.

See also
 List of markets in Lagos

References

Retail markets in Lagos